Rodri may refer to:

 Rodri (footballer, born 1934) (1934–2022), full name Francisco Rodríguez García, Spanish football defender for Barcelona
 Rodri (footballer, born 1942), full name Roberto Rodríguez Aguirre, Spanish football goalkeeper for Atletico Madrid
 Rodri (footballer, born 1971), full name Antonio Rodríguez Saravia, Spanish football forward and manager for Gimnàstic etc
 Rodri (footballer, born 1979), full name Rodrigo Gimeno Molina, Spanish football midfielder for Castellón
 Rodri (footballer, born 1984), full name Sergio Rodríguez García, Spanish football defender for Spartak Moscow, Eupen etc
 Rodri (footballer, born 1985), full name Rodrigo Ángel Gil Torres, Spanish football midfielder for Elche, Orihuela etc
 Rodri (footballer, born 1986), full name Rodrigo Suárez Peña, Spanish football midfielder for Betis
 Rodri (footballer, born 1990), full name Rodrigo Ríos Lozano, Spanish football forward for Córdoba, Oviedo etc
 Rodri (footballer, born 1996), full name Rodrigo Hernández Cascante, Spanish football midfielder for Villarreal, Manchester City etc
 Rodri (footballer, born 2000), full name Rodrigo Sánchez Rodríguez, Spanish football midfielder for Betis
 Rodri (footballer, born 2003), full name Rodrigo Alonso Martín, Spanish football midfielder for Villarreal

See also
 Rodrigo (disambiguation)
 Rodriguez (disambiguation)